The 48th Golden Horse Awards (Mandarin:第48屆金馬獎) took place on November 26, 2011, at Hsinchu Performing Arts Center in Hsinchu, Taiwan.

References

48th
2011 film awards
2011 in Taiwan